Ivan Hetsko (born 6 April 1968) is a former Soviet and Ukrainian international football player who played 4 matches for the Ukraine national football team. His only goal happened to be the first goal of Ukraine in the national side's first ever match, a friendly against Hungary. In 2002, he played for Ukrainian futsal club Signal Odessa.

See also
 Ukraine 1–3 Hungary (1992 association football friendly), the first match for Ukraine

References

1968 births
Living people
Footballers from Dnipro
Lviv College of Physical Culture alumni
Ukrainian footballers
Ukrainian expatriate footballers
Soviet footballers
Soviet Union international footballers
Maccabi Haifa F.C. players
Expatriate footballers in Israel
Ukraine international footballers
FC Spartak Vladikavkaz players
FC Dnipro players
FC Kryvbas Kryvyi Rih players
FC Kryvbas-2 Kryvyi Rih players
FC Metalist Kharkiv players
FC Metalist-2 Kharkiv players
FC SKA-Karpaty Lviv players
FC Chornomorets Odesa players
FC Karpaty Lviv players
FC Hoverla Uzhhorod players
Dual internationalists (football)
FC Lokomotiv Nizhny Novgorod players
Ukrainian Premier League players
Ukrainian Second League players
Russian Premier League players
Soviet Top League players
Association football forwards